Canaan is a Canadian community, located in Westmorland County, New Brunswick. The community is situated in southeastern New Brunswick, to the northwest of Moncton. Canaan is located mainly at the intersection of New Brunswick Route 126 and New Brunswick Route 485. which is also situated around the Canaan River.  Canaan is sometimes referred to as Canaan Station but Canaan is the official name.

History

In July 1930 an Al G. Barnes Circus train consisted of 29 cars, passed Canaan, the 18th car jumped the rails and it and the remaining cars piled into a tangled heap killing 4 and injuring several others.

Notable people

See also
List of communities in New Brunswick

References

Bordering communities

Hebert, New Brunswick
Saint-Paul, New Brunswick
Gallagher Ridge, New Brunswick
New Scotland, New Brunswick
Terrains de L'Évêque, New Brunswick

Communities in Westmorland County, New Brunswick